Henry Frances Kenny (7 September 1913 – 25 September 1975) was an Irish Fine Gael politician who served as Minister of State at the Department of Finance from 1973 to 1975. He served as a Teachta Dála (TD) from 1954 to 1975. He was the father of former Taoiseach Enda Kenny.

He was also a Gaelic footballer who won an All-Ireland Senior Football Championship medal with the Mayo county team in 1936.

Early life
Kenny was born on Main Street, Castlebar, County Mayo, in 1913. He was educated at the local St Patrick's national school and St Gerald's College. He subsequently attended St Patrick's College in Drumcondra, Dublin, where he qualified as a national school teacher. After graduation he taught in Connemara and Williamstown, County Galway, before being appointed principal of Leitir national school in Islandeady, County Mayo.

Football career

Club
He played his club Gaelic football with Castlebar Mitchels club, and won several county senior championship medals in the 1930s.

Inter-county
Kenny's performances at club level earned him a place on the senior Mayo county team. He was a member of the record-breaking Mayo team that won six consecutive National Football League titles from 1934 until 1939. Kenny also won an All-Ireland winners' medal in 1936.

Political career
His entry into politics was unusual in the sense that neither he nor his family were steeped in politics at the time. In spite of this he was elected to Dáil Éireann at his first attempt, at the 1954 general election, as a Fine Gael Teachta Dála (TD) for the Mayo South constituency. The election saw Fine Gael enter government as the lead party in the country's second inter-party government. Kenny, as a new TD, remained on the backbenches; however, he was subsequently elected to Mayo County Council.

Kenny retained his seat at the 1957 general election; however, Fine Gael lost power as Fianna Fáil began sixteen years of uninterrupted government. During that time he retained his Dáil seat at every general election, moving to the Mayo West constituency in 1969. That same year he was appointed Fine Gael spokesperson on the Board of Works, a position he held until 1972. The results of the 1973 general election saw Fine Gael and the Labour Party form a coalition government. Kenny was appointed Parliamentary Secretary to the Minister for Finance where he had responsibility for the Board of Works.

Death and private life
Two years after being appointed to the government, Kenny was diagnosed with cancer. He died on 25 September 1975. He married Eithne McGinley in 1944 and they had five children. His son, Enda Kenny, was elected to the Dáil at the by-election in 1975. Another son, also Henry Kenny, was a member of Mayo County Council from 1999 to 2019. His widow Eithne Kenny died at the age of 93 in Castlebar on 26 November 2011.

See also
Families in the Oireachtas

References

 

 

 

1913 births
1975 deaths
Alumni of St Patrick's College, Dublin
Deaths from cancer in the Republic of Ireland
Fathers of Taoisigh
Fine Gael TDs
Heads of schools in Ireland
Irish schoolteachers
Henry
Mayo inter-county Gaelic footballers
Members of the 15th Dáil
Members of the 16th Dáil
Members of the 17th Dáil
Members of the 18th Dáil
Members of the 19th Dáil
Members of the 20th Dáil
Parliamentary Secretaries of the 20th Dáil
Politicians from County Mayo
People from Castlebar
People educated at St Gerald's College, Castlebar